The Pacific Coast Senior League (also known as the Pacific Coast Hockey League) was a senior men's amateur ice hockey league that operated for the 1952–53 season.

Teams
Fresno Falcons
Los Angeles Cardinals
Oakland Knaves
San Bernardino Braves

External links
League profile at Hockeydb

Ice hockey in California